Malaria No More is a nonprofit organization that seeks to eradicate malaria. The organization has offices in the United States, as well as affiliates in India, Japan and the United Kingdom, and is known for its participation in the Idol Gives Back charity specials.

History 
Malaria No More was established in December 2006 by business leaders looking to apply private sector expertise and entrepreneurial methods to tackling malaria.

Since Malaria No More's inception - at the White House event that launched the U.S. President's Malaria Initiative in 2006 - Malaria No More has worked to mobilize political commitment, funding and innovation, with the goal of "ending malaria within our generation."

Convened by Malaria No More, Forecasting Healthy Futures is a growing coalition of global health, technology and public sector partners coming together to bring greater attention to the inequities at the intersection of global health and climate change among policy makers and thought leaders across sectors and to promote proactive, resilient solutions that use integrated data and artificial intelligence to anticipate and mitigate the worst health effects of a warming planet.

References

External links
 Malaria No More's official Website
 Forecasting Healthy Futures
 Twittering for a Good Cause, CNN, April 17, 2009
 Big Guns Enter Malaria Fight, Wall Street Journal, September 26, 2008
 Saving the World in Study Hall, New York Times, May 11, 2008

Non-profit organizations based in Washington (state)
Malaria organizations
Organizations established in 2006
Medical and health organizations based in Washington (state)